The Henry Iba Award was established in 1959 to recognize the best college basketball coach of the year by the United States Basketball Writers Association (USBWA).  Five nominees are presented and the individual with the most votes receives the award, which is presented in conjunction with the Final Four.  The award is named for Henry Iba, who coached at Oklahoma State from 1934 to 1970.  Iba won the NCAA College Championship in 1945 and 1946 and coached the U.S. Olympic Teams to two gold medals in 1964 and 1968. The award is presented at the Oscar Robertson Trophy Breakfast on the Friday before the Final Four.

Legendary UCLA Bruins coach John Wooden has the most all–time selections with seven. Of the seven other coaches with multiple Henry Iba Awards, only Virginia Cavaliers coach Tony Bennett has received it more than twice. The school with the second–most winners is Ohio State, which has had two coaches win a total of three awards (Fred Taylor, Randy Ayers).

Key

Winners

Footnotes
 Due to the massive numbers—and extreme severity of—NCAA violations that had surfaced, Clem Haskins and the Minnesota men's basketball season records and awards were nullified, giving them a 0–0 record and no official recognition for having gotten to the 1997 Final Four.

References
General

Specific

External links
 Henry Iba Award

Awards established in 1959
College basketball coach of the year awards in the United States